Barolineocerus acius is a species of leafhopper native to Peru. It is named for the barb-shaped apex of the reproductive organs.  It is distinguished from species in the genus by the sharply pointed male subgenital plate.

References

Insects described in 2008
Hemiptera of South America
Eurymelinae